The Rhamnales Lindl. are an order of dicotyledon plants in the subclass Rosidae. In the Cronquist system, the following families were placed here:

 Family Elaeagnaceae – (Oleaster family)
 Family Leeaceae
 Family Rhamnaceae (buckthorn family)
 Family Vitaceae (grape family)

Leea may be included within the Vitaceae.  The Rhamnaceae are no longer considered close relatives of these other forms, and newer systems move them to the Rosales.  The order then becomes the Vitales.

Under the APG III system of classification, Rhamnales is not recognized. Instead, the families previously included here under the Cronquist system are included under the following orders:
 Elaeagnaceae and Rhamnaceae are placed within Rosales
 Leea, formerly recognized in its own family Leeaceae, is included within Vitaceae, which is recognized in its own order, Vitales

References

External links

Historically recognized angiosperm orders